Richard West may refer to:

Richard West, 7th Baron De La Warr and 4th Baron West (1430–1475/6)
Richard West (died 1674) (1636–1674), English landowner and politician
Richard West (priest) (1670?–1716), English churchman and academic, archdeacon of Berkshire
Richard West (Lord Chancellor of Ireland) (c. 1691–1726), 18th-century Irish politician and lawyer
Richard Temple West (1827–1893), English clergyman and academic
Richard West (outlaw) (1860–1898), outlaw of the Old West
Richard Annesley West (1878–1918), British army officer, Victoria Cross recipient
W. Richard West Sr. (1912–1996), Cheyenne, artist and director of Bacone College's art program
Dick West (baseball) (1915–1996), baseball player
Richard West (cricketer, born 1916), English cricketer
Richard West (cricketer, born 1920) (1920–1985), English cricketer
Richard Gilbert West (born 1926), British botanist and geologist
Richard West (journalist) (1930–2015), British journalist and author
Richard W. West (1932–1936), mayor of Newport News, Virginia
Richard Martin West (born 1941), Danish astronomer
W. Richard West Jr. (born 1943), Cheyenne, founding Director of the Smithsonian National Museum of the American Indian
Richard West (keyboardist) (born 1967), member of British rock band Threshold
Mr. C (Richard West, born 1968), British DJ and musician
Richard West (rugby union) (born 1971), former English rugby union footballer
Richard West (footballer), (born 1985),  Jamaican footballer
Richard C. West, Tolkien scholar
Richard West Houses, a building in Toronto, Canada